George Hunter Henderson (2 May 1880 – 27 January 1930) was a Scottish footballer who played as a right half for Rangers, Middlesbrough and Chelsea amongst others. He won the Scottish Cup with Rangers in 1903.

Henderson played once for Scotland, against Ireland on 26 March 1904.

References

External links
Details of Rangers career

1880 births
1930 deaths
Scottish footballers
Queen's Park F.C. players
Dundee F.C. players
Rangers F.C. players
Middlesbrough F.C. players
Chelsea F.C. players
Association football wing halves
Scotland international footballers
Glossop North End A.F.C. players
People from Galashiels
Sportspeople from the Scottish Borders
Scottish Football League players
English Football League players